Arujá is a city in the state of São Paulo in Brazil. It is part of the Metropolitan Region of São Paulo. The population is 91,157 (2020 est.) in an area of 96.17 km². Its boundaries are Santa Isabel in the north and the northeast, Mogi das Cruzes in the southeast, Itaquaquecetuba in the south and Guarulhos to the west and the northwest.

The municipality contains part of the  Mananciais do Rio Paraíba do Sul Environmental Protection Area, created in 1982 to protect the sources of the Paraíba do Sul river.

References

External links

Guia de Arujá 

Municipalities in São Paulo (state)